Gorodishchensky District is an administrative district (raion), one of the thirty-three in Volgograd Oblast, Russia. As a municipal division, it is incorporated as Gorodishchensky Municipal District. It is located in the southern central part of the oblast. Its administrative center is the urban locality (a work settlement) of Gorodishche. Population:  57,308 (2002 Census);  The population of Gorodishche accounts for 35.5% of the district's total population.

Economy
The economy of the district is predominantly agricultural.

Attractions
Soldiers' Field Memorial is located in the district.

References

Notes

Sources

Districts of Volgograd Oblast